The 1984–85 Middle Tennessee Blue Raiders men's basketball team represented Middle Tennessee State University during the 1984–85 NCAA Division I men's basketball season. The Blue Raiders, led by first-year head coach Bruce Stewart, played their home games at the Murphy Center in Murfreesboro, Tennessee and were members of the Ohio Valley Conference. They finished the season 17–14, 7–7 in OVC play to finish 5th in the regular season standings. In the OVC tournament, they defeated Murray State, Tennessee Tech, and Youngstown State to receive the conference's automatic bid to the NCAA tournament. As the No. 15 seed in the West region, they were defeated by No. 2 seed North Carolina, 76–57, in the opening round.

Roster

Schedule and results

|-
!colspan=9 style=| Regular season

|-
!colspan=9 style=| OVC tournament

|-
!colspan=9 style=| NCAA tournament

References

Middle Tennessee Blue Raiders men's basketball seasons
Middle Tennessee
Middle Tennessee
Middle Tennessee Blue Raiders
Middle Tennessee Blue Raiders